Events from the year 1700 in art.

Events
 Luca Giordano returns to Naples a wealthy man after the death of his patron, Charles II of Spain.
 Pierre Le Gros the Younger is elected to the Accademia di San Luca.

Works
Richard Brakenburgh – A May Queen Festival
Pierre Gobert
Portrait of Abbé Fleury
Portrait of Françoise-Marie de Bourbon, Duchess of Chartres
Sir Godfrey Kneller – Portrait of Lady Mary Berkeley, wife of Thomas Chambers
Sebastiano Ricci
Frescoes and Saint Gregory the Great intercedes with the Madonna in chapel of Santissimo Sacramento in church of Abbey of Santa Giustina, Padua
Venus and Cupid (approximate date: 1549

Births 
 January 1 – Antonio Galli Bibiena, Italian architect/painter, also at Vienna Hofburg (died 1774)
 January 8 – Augustyn Mirys, Polish painter (died 1790)
 March 3 – Charles-Joseph Natoire, French painter (died 1777)
 May 12 – Luigi Vanvitelli, Italian-born architect (died 1773)
 August 18 – Lars Pinnerud, Norwegian farmer and woodcarver (died 1762)
 September 25 – Gaetano Zompini, Italian printmaker and engraver (died 1778)
 October 10 – Lambert-Sigisbert Adam, French sculptor (died 1759)
 date unknown
 Bernard Baron, French engraver (died 1766)
 Elizabeth Blackwell, Scottish botanical illustrator and author (died 1758)
 Francesco Caccianiga, Italian painter and engraver (died 1781)
 Tommaso Costanzi, Italian gem engraver of the late-Baroque period (died 1747)
 Michel-François Dandré-Bardon, French historical painter and etcher (died 1785)
 Antonio Joli, Italian painter of veduta (died 1777)
 Krzysztof Perwanger, Polish sculptor and mayor (died 1785)
 Felice Polanzani, Italian engraver (died 1771)
 Rocco Pozzi, Italian painter and engraver (died 1780)
 Ivan Ranger, Austrian painter (died 1753)
 Antonio Rossi, Italian painter (died 1773)
 Mattheus Verheyden, Dutch painter (died 1776)
 Jacopo Zoboli, Italian etcher and painter of altarpieces and portraits (died 1765)
 Gaetano Zompini, Italian printmaker and engraver (died 1778)
 probable – Giuseppe Peroni, Italian painter of frescoes (died 1776)

Deaths
March 4 – Lorenzo Pasinelli, Italian painter in a Mannerist style of genre-like allegories (born 1629)
May 30 – Antoine Masson, French line engraver (born 1636)
July 2 – Lambert Doomer, Dutch painter (born 1624)
September 15 – André Le Nôtre, French landscape architect (born 1613)
October 29 – Giovanni Giacomo Borni, Italian painter, active in Lombardy (born 1635)
November 7 – Pietro Santi Bartoli, painter and engraver (born 1635)
date unknown
Francisco Antolínez, Spanish historical and landscape painter (born 1644)
Pietro Bellotti, Italian painter (born 1625)
Agostino Bonisoli, Italian painter, active mainly in Cremona (born 1633)
Caius Gabriel Cibber, Danish sculptor active in England (born 1630)
Ricardo do Pilar, Brazilian monk and painter (born 1635)
Matteo Ghidoni,  Italian painter of burlesque genre paintings (date of birth unknown)
Agostino Lamma, Italian painter specializing in battle paintings (born 1636)
Pedro Nuñez de Villavicencio, Spanish painter (born 1635)
Johannes Skraastad, Norwegian woodcarver (born 1648)
Hans van Steenwinckel the Youngest, Danish sculptor and architect (born 1639)
Jacobus Storck, Dutch Golden Age painter (born 1641)
Giovanni Maria Viani, Italian painter and etcher (born 1636)
Muhammad Zaman, Safavid calligrapher and painter (born unknown)
probable
Edmund Ashfield,  English portrait painter and miniaturist (born unknown)
Giulio Giacinto Avellino, Italian painter (born 1645)
Bernardo Polo, Spanish painter depicting still-life paintings of fruit and flowers (born unknown)

References

 
Years of the 17th century in art
1700s in art